The Stoomvaart Maatschappij Nederland ("Netherlands Steamship Company") or SMN, also known as the Netherland Line or Nederland Line, was a Dutch shipping line that operated from 1870 until 1970, when it merged with several other companies to form what would become Royal Nedlloyd.

The company's motto, Semper Mare Navigandum ("Always sail the seas"), conveniently fitted the same initials.

Foundation

Introduction 
The SMN was founded on May 13, 1870 in Amsterdam for the trade between North Western Europe and the former Dutch East Indies (modern Indonesia) via the newly opened Suez Canal. Construction of the Suez Canal had started on 25 April 1859. Together with the development of steam engines with lower coal consumption (the compound engine), the realization of a suitable canal would make sailing ships obsolete on the passage to the East Indies. Of course many had a wait and see attitude towards the canal, but when it was nearing completion in 1869, it became clear that something had to be done.

Park meeting and commission to found the SMN 

On 17 August 1869 a new international organisation for the development of trade met in the Parkzaal (now Wertheim park) in Amsterdam. It discussed the opening of the Suez Canal and an upcoming trade congress in Cairo. Mr. J. Boissevain stated that it was now possible and necessary to establish a steam shipping line to Java. The Netherlands had to take the initiative, and had to do so quickly. Government support was essential because the government was the biggest trader on Java. Mr. Boele noted that Dutch shipping to the Indies and across the Atlantic was so backward that it could not establish the steam shipping line without the help of the government and foreign aid. It was not about subsidies, but about cooperation, because the state was a monopolist on Java. He also noted that English capital and ships to establish a steam shipping line had already been offered to him via the Dutch consul in Liverpool. Engineer A. Huet urged more speed on the works of the harbors for Amsterdam and Rotterdam. Mr. Boelen (a different speaker than Boele) made some remarks that the new steam ships should be made suitable to carry passengers, freight and coal, without going to deep.

The chairman of the congress then brought three motions to decide on: The first was that the Dutch trading community should be present in Cairo. The third was that the Suez Canal should be neutral. The second motion was about the statements by Boissevain and Boele. The congress stated that it thought the immediate establishment of a steam shipping line to be the best way to profit from the new canal, and recommended the company to the trading community and the government.

Now the government acted quickly. By 26 August 1869 a commission had been formed on the instigation and under the protection of Prince Hendrik, nicknamed "The Seafarer". It consisted of G.J. Boelen, J.G. Bunge and J. Boissevain and was to negotiate the foundation of a regular steam shipping line from the Netherlands via Suez to the Dutch East Indies. On 31 August the commission was working 'under the leadership of Prince Henry' at Soestdijk Palace his summer residence. On 1 September the commission was summoned and received by the king. He was informed of the plans and views of the commission and declared that the foundation of the shipping line was one of his most serious wishes.

The questions and challenges that had to be addressed out by the commission were many. The kind of ships that were required, the number of ships required, a calculation of when the company would be profitable, and finally how much capital was required. The required amount of capital was staggering and required some kind of government assistance, subsidy or guarantee to raise it. This was also why Prince Henry was involved. The Amsterdam Chamber of Commerce was also involved in the discussion, and addressed the finance minister to support and cooperate in the plan for a direct shipping line between the Netherlands and Java. In mid September the commission again met at Soestdijk.

The contract between the State and the Company 
In February 1870 a contract was signed between the Department for the Colonies and the commission. It was a detailed agreement. The commission would get the time to found a public company before 15 May 1870. It had to commission four steamships of a certain specification for a line to the Dutch East Indies. The first of these had to leave for the Indies within one year of founding the company. On each return trip the government would guarantee a substantial amount of cargo for a minimum price. In return the state got a preferred position on the less costly route towards the Dutch East Indies. There were penalties for trips that took longer than 50 days. The guaranteed price and preferred position would last till 1 January 1875, at which date a new contract would start.

The complexity of the guarantee was connected with the trade system on Java. The Netherlands Trading Society still had a quasi monopoly on the production of coffee, tea, sugar and indigo, and Dutch shipping lines could subscribe to transporting these for the lowest price. If this system was maintained, steamships would not get any cargo. Steamships had higher costs, but for the owner of the cargo a higher tariff was redeemed by lower capital cost, lower insurance cost and better quality. Therefore, the Netherlands Trading Society had to agree beforehand on paying for this advantage, instead of using (or being forced to use by law) her monopoly to drive down prices on steamships to the level of those for sailing ships.

The guarantee was devised such that on each return trip to the Netherlands Trading Society would guarantee a cargo of 600 lasts (c. 1,200 tons), but in total not more than 4,800 lasts in the first year. The guaranteed price would be 22,50 guilders higher than the average price agreed by the NTS for sailing ships in the previous 12 months. The minimum for this average would be 75 guilders per last, so the guaranteed price was 97.50 guilders. In case that the company would use smaller ships, this minimum would be 20 guilders above the average. For tin the tariff would be only one fourth of the above.

Prospectus and foundation of the public company 
On 14 March 1870 the prospectus of the company was published. The board of directors would consist of the executive members: G.J. Boelen, J. Boissevain and C.J. Viehoff; and the non-executive members J.G. Bunge, A.C. Wertheim, C.A. Crommelin, A.A. Bienfait all from Amsterdam, and M.M. de Monchy (Rotterdam), P.C. Loopuyt (Rotterdam) and J.E. Cornelissen (Utrecht). There was also a supervisory board of commissioners, not directors, consisting of C.J.A. den Tex mayor of Amsterdam,  E. Fuld, E. Mohr, A.R.J. Cramerus and C.F. Quien all from Amsterdam, under the honorary presidency of Prince Henry. The capital of the company would be 6,000,000 guilders, of which 3,500,000 would be placed, divided in shares of 1,000 guilders each and sub-shares of 500 guilders each. The money would be used to buy ships and invest in warehouses, workshops and jetties. The prospectus announced that the company would buy somewhat larger ships than required. The prospectus held a rather detailed calculation of the profitability of the investment, promising a 16% dividend.

The public could subscribe to shares on 24, 25 and 26 March 1870. The subscription failed when it got stuck on 2,487,000 guilders, one million short. A new subscription was opened for 2 and 4 April. This second attempt succeeded in placing the remaining shares.

On 13 May 1870 the contract for the foundation of the public company was signed. It led to a very long publication of the names and number of shares of all shareholders in the company.

Requirements for the first ships 
In late September 1869 some thoughts about the required ships had been published. It started with a description of recent developments in the construction of steamships and steam propulsion. Ships had become longer, carried more cargo, had smaller engines, lower coal consumption and combined all this with sufficient speed. As a consequence the sailing ship with auxiliary power was losing ground, and especially the British shipping lines were opting for full steam power on their oceanic lines in the western hemisphere. It concluded that for the shipping line to Java the most suitable ship was a screw steamship of 2,500 tons capacity with 400 or 450 hp. These would be able to make the journey in 36–40 days including days lost in bunkering coal in Egypt. A big part of the cargo space would be lost in loading coal for half the trip. Much space would be taken by passengers and soldiers, but even so a significant amount of space would be left for cargo. The freight tariff was expected to be so high that coffee, tobacco, sugar would still be transported by sailing ships. The SMN expected that the advantage of quicker transport was so big that coffee would be transported by steamship.

The contract between the state and the company required the company to commission four ships of a certain minimum size. An annex contained a description of these ships based on negotiations with shipbuilder John Elder. The ships were described as being 2,400 tons Builders Measure, or 2,000 Register tons. They would have to be about 320 feet long between perpendiculars. Beam was to be about 39 feet, and hold till the spar deck 29 feet. The preferred type would be spar deck or flush deck, and the ships would answer to the requirements of several lloyd's. Cargo space should be about 120,000 cubic feet and about 640 tons of coal would have to be loaded. With 2,300 tons of cargo, 700 tons of coal, and about 100 tons of provisions, draught should be 22.5 feet.

Accommodation was specified as 50 passengers first class, 50-200 passengers 2nd and 3rd class and 70 crew. First class accommodation would be between the stern and the machine room. Each cabin would have no more than two beds, not placed above each other, and leaving room for wash stands, luggage etc. Longitudinal and transverse corridors, portholes and other measures should ensure lighting and ventilation of the cabins. The saloon of the first class should span the whole width of the ship, and be divided in a general saloon and a ladies room, both closed off from the cabins by doors. On the spar deck there would be a small smokers and ladies room etc. etc. A light schooner rigging would be carried as a safety precaution.

The engines would be 325 hp Elders compound engines. These would have to be able to develop 1,300 effective hp. Two cylindrical boilers with 6 furnaces each would have to be able to handle 60 pound steam pressure. The space taken by the engine was also limited by the contract. All in all the engines and boilers should give the ship a speed of 10 knots with a coal consumption of 23-25 tons. The trial run would have to reach 11 knots. The specification was signed on account of John Elder by Ch.J. Viehoff. The company could deviate somewhat from this contract, especially on account of the depth of the Suez Canal. The prospectus of 14 March 1870 announced somewhat larger ships than required. The ships would be of 2,000 tons cargo space and 400 nominal horse power, 1,600 ihp in order to ensure a more regular service.

Operational history

The 1870s 

The Stoomvaart Maatschappij Nederland was based in Amsterdam, but initially its ships could not reach that city. From 1870 to 1879 the company's ships therefore sailed from Den Helder (Nieuwediep) to Java. The company also had its own warehouses in Nieuwediep for loading and unloading to smaller ships, that could reach Amsterdam via the Noordhollandsch Kanaal. Passengers, mail and some freight that required fast service could go by train to and from Naples, Marseilles or Genoa in order to keep the travelling time as short as possible, but this was not done on the first trips.

As regards freight, the company could initially profit from a government guarantee of about half the homeward freight during the first four years. This freight primarily consisted of goods produced by the government-run plantations and industries in the East Indies. E.g. tin from Bangka, tobacco, tea and copra. From Europe SMN would ship manufactured goods, factory equipment and railroad materials.

1871 
The first ship of the SMN, SS Willem III arrived in Nieuwdiep on 8 May 1871. She left for the East Indies on 17 May, but was burnt and beached near Wight two days later. She was insured for 800,000 guilders, and so SMN suffered a heavy loss, but could order a new ship to replace her. This would become Koning der Nederlanden. The second ship of the SMN was SS Prins van Oranje. She arrived in Batavia on 9 September 1871. She started her return voyage on 15 October, but got so much trouble with her propellers, that her return was delayed to 30 December 1871. The delay and the repeated repairs led to a significant loss. The third ship of the company was Prins Hendrik. She arrived in Nieuwdiep on 2 November 1871 under Captain Hendriks, and was noted to be much longer than the previous two ships. She left Nieuwediep on 19 November 1871, and arrived in Batavia on 29 December 1871.

1872 
After the disastrous first year of the company an extraordinary meeting of shareholders was convened on 25 March 1872. The apparent reasons were the disaster of SS Willem III and the screw problems of Prins van Oranje and Prins Hendrik causing so much trouble for the SMN that she was out of money. This meeting took place in the Amstelhotel. The directors wanted to change the articles of association of the company, and to issue a convertible loan of 3,500,000 guilders. A critic noted that the board gave a rather limited account of why it needed more money to strengthen the capital, and why it wanted to buy two more ships. He wanted more details about how the stock of 3,500,000 had been spent and about the profitability of the first trips. He also wanted details about the problems with the ships built in Scotland.

Five shareholders from Rotterdam (Mees, Plate, Pincoffs, Pols and Ruys) required a change in the articles so that the directors would no longer appoint captains and shipping agencies. Their problem was that director G.J. Boelen was also the exclusive shipping agent for the company, and they wanted to see the contract with him. The board announced that G.J. Boelen had resigned, and had the contract read to the meeting, instead of distributing it in print. It showed that the exclusive contract had been made for ten years, with high penalties in case the board would end it. Such a contract was clearly not in the interest of the SMN and the shareholders. After a lot of commotion Mr. Plate noted that: while he was busy promoting the establishment of the SMN among investors in Rotterdam, he could not imagine that one of the directors would appoint himself as its exclusive shipping agent. Shortly after the meeting Mr Plate was decorated with the Order of the Netherlands Lion. F.D. Franssen van de Putte then carried a motion to appoint a commission to investigate how the board should be formed.  He was appointed chairman, and other members were C. Hartsen, N.G. Pierson, L. Pincoffs and P.H. Holzman. On 31 May 1872 the regular shareholders meeting took place. The loss for 1871 was 141,000 guilders, about 85,000 was caused by the burning of Willem III, 10,000 by the delayed first trip of Prins van Oranje. The report by the Franssen van de Putte commission was treated, and led to more authority for the executive directors.

During 1872 the results improved to an operational result of 178,767 guilders, but depreciation turned this into a loss of 48,507 guilders. The SMN did prove the correctness of establishing a steam shipping line. Freight for tobacco paid by merchants was 90-110 guilders a last for steamships, as opposed 55-70 guilders for sailing ships. The board mentioned that the backward harbor of Batavia cost her 12-16 guilders a last for transloading, and compared it to the much cheaper Singapore. For outbound freight SMN started to include a stop at Southampton, so British manufactured goods could be loaded. The board also mentioned that Prins van Oranje had been allowed to use the navy dry dock at Onrust Island in order to repair her screw, and that she wanted to invest 25,000 guilders in the establishment of the Nederlandsch Indische Droogdok Maatschappij, which would establish dry docks for merchant ships.

As regards operations, the fourth ship was SS Conrad. She arrived at Nieuwediep on 19 February 1872 under command of captain Oort. In November 1872 the fifth ship Koning der Nederlanden arrived in Nieuwediep. With this replacement for Willem III the SMN finally had four ships in operation.

1873 and later 

In 1873 SS Prins Hendrik I was wrecked on the Brothers Islands in the Red Sea on 27 September. Almost immediately a replacement, SS Prins Hendrik II was ordered in Glasgow. SMN would also order Prinses Amalia in 1873, and the orders for SS Voorwaarts were probably also given in 1873. As such SMN executed the above plans to increase her fleet to six ships. During 1873 9 outbound and 8 homeward bound trips were made with the first four ships, as well as three outbound trips with chartered ships. The net profit over 1873 was 193,879 guilders after 153,600 guilders had been booked on depreciation. The net profit was used to cover the losses of the first years.

In 1874 the three new steamships were commissioned, and one ships was chartered. Net profit was 230,000 guilders, leading to a dividend (the first) of 5%. In 1875 the SMN did very well, with a growth in cargo and passengers of about 75%, and ships sailing faster and more reliable. It led to an operational profit of 820,000 guilders, after depreciation of 380,000, divided was again 5%. The only cargo that decreased was the amount of produce transported for the Netherlands Trading Society. Strictly commercial parties offered to pay a higher tariff to SMN for shipping their products, and so the trading society was forced to ship produce on cheaper ships.

In 1876 the SMN started a cooperation with her competitor the Stoomvaart Maatschappij Java (SMJ). On 31 May 1876 the shareholders of SMJ approved the lease of all the ships of SMJ to SMN. That same day the SMN held her regular shareholders meeting, and proposed the cooperation with the SMJ. The SMN shareholders were far less enthusiastic but in the end they also agreed. Most of the ships of the SMJ would be used for cargo, except for SS Celebes.

The 1880s 
The new Noordzeekanaal (North Sea Canal) opened in November 1876 and connected Amsterdam directly to the North Sea. It created an easier route to SMN's home base, but it took some more time to make it deep enough for big fully loaded sea ships. The first of these arrived in Amsterdam in October 1878. In order to be able to repair her ships, SMN enabled the foundation of the Amsterdamsche Droogdok Maatschappij by taking almost three-quarters of the shares.

The company then got its own infrastructure in Amsterdam. The Oostelijke Handelskade (Eastern Trade dock, 1883–1910) and the Java and Sumatra docks became its center in The Netherlands. In Europe ships called regularly at Amsterdam, Southampton and Genoa. In the Dutch East Indies ships plied mainly to the ports on the northern coast of the island of Java, e.g. Jakarta (then known as Batavia), Surabaya and Tanjung Priok. Coal was regularly taken at Valletta, Port Said, Aden, Colombo and Sabang.

In the early decades of the 20th century the company opened new routes operating across the Pacific Ocean between Java and the American West Coast, and, via the Panama Canal, between Java and New York City.

World War II and Post-War activities 

During the Second World War many of the company's ships were commandeered to support the Allied military effort, and a number were lost to enemy action.

Following the birth of the State of Indonesia in 1949, and the subsequent loosening of the old colonial ties, trade with the former colonies declined (some trade with Indonesia remained possible until 1960; thereafter Dutch vessels were no longer allowed to ply in Indonesian waters). In dire need of new business, the company intensified development of its other routes – linking Holland, South Africa, North and South America, India and the Far East – and also built up its chartering business.

In addition to its freight and passenger services, SMN also actively took part in other transport ventures – for example, Martin Air Charter (now Martinair), the specialized LNG tanker Antilla Cape, Container Terminal Amsterdam (CTA) and van Swieten Trucking. In the 1960s SMN acquired Hollandsche Stoomboot Maatschappij with regular services to England and West Africa.

Starting in the late 1950s, the advent of mass air travel spelled the end of the ocean liners. The company's passenger routes were closed and the ships sold, leaving the company to concentrate on freight, which from the 1970s onwards increasingly meant container ships.

Collaborations and mergers 
Hailing from Amsterdam, SMN always enjoyed friendly competition and rivalry with Rotterdam shipping company Rotterdamsche Lloyd (KRL), especially on the East Indies route. In 1963 SMN and KRL jointly founded Nedlloyd Lines (NLL). From 1968 the SMN also closely cooperated with KJCPL–RIL (Royal InterOcean Lines) of Amsterdam and Hong Kong.

This cooperation amongst friendly Dutch shipowners eventually resulted in a full merger. On January 20, 1970, the SMN joined with three other companies to form the Nederlandsche Scheepvaart Unie (NSU) and ceased to exist as a separate entity, having just failed to reach its 100th anniversary. The NSU partners were:

Stoomvaart Maatschappij Nederland (SMN)
Koninklijke Rotterdamsche Lloyd (KRL)
Koninklijke Java-China-Paketvaart-Lijnen (KJCPL)
Vereenigde Nederlandsche Scheepvaartmaatschappij (VNS)

Later on NSU became Nedlloyd, and in 1977 the name changed to Koninklijke Nedlloyd ("Royal Nedlloyd"). In 1981 the Koninklijke Nederlandsche Stoomboot-Maatschappij (KNSM) completed the group.

In 1996, Koninklijke Nedlloyd merged its container shipping interests with the British company P&O to become, as P&O Nedlloyd, a major player in the worldwide container trade. In 2005 A.P. Moller-Maersk Group (Maersk) from Denmark acquired P&O Nedlloyd and the newly formed Maersk Line subsequently became the world's largest container shipping line.

Offices 
SMN headquartered at the IJgracht in Amsterdam, later at the Scheepvaarthuis (Shipping House) together with other shipping companies. Employees arriving by bicycle came through the side entrance and used the famous Paternoster elevators to reach their floors. A monumental staircase led directly to the directors' floor.

The company also maintained offices in Jakarta.

Heritage 
The history and heritage of the Stoomboot Maatschappij 'Nederland' and other Dutch shipping companies is preserved at the Amsterdam and Rotterdam maritime museums.

Fleet development

The four required ships 
  (lost May 1871)
 
  (lost 27 September 1873)
 SS Conrad
  (3,000 tons, sunk on 5 October 1881. Three of her lifeboats with a total of 90 passengers and crew were never found.)

Alphabetical list of vessels 
The Netherland Line's first vessel, SS Willem III, was launched in 1871. Its last under that flag were the Neder "L-class" vessels Neder Linge and Neder Lek, launched in 1967/68. The following is a selected list of the vessels operated by the company throughout its 100-year history. Tonnages are approximate.

Bali
Balong
Banda
Banggai
Batjan
Batu
Bawean
Bengkalis
Boissevain
Borneo
Celebes
 (liner, 16,000 tons, launched 1927, destroyed by mine 1945)

Johan de Witt
 (liner, 19,000 tons, launched 1929, sold and renamed Lakonia 1963, destroyed by fire 1963)
Karakorum
Karimata
Karimun
 (3,000 tons, sunk on 5 October 1881. Three of her lifeboats with a total of 90 passengers and crew were never found.)
 (liner, 19,000 tons, launched 1930, sunk by torpedo 1945)
Neder Ebro
Neder Eems
Neder Lek (freighter, 10,000 tons, launched 1968)
Neder Linge (freighter, 10,000 tons, launched 1967)
Neder Rhone
Neder Rijn
Neder Waal
Neder Weser
Nieuw Holland
Oranje (liner, 20,000 tons, launched 1938, sold and renamed Angelina Lauro 1964, destroyed by fire 1979)
 (liner launched 1925, caught fire at builders, another fire ended her career)
Poelau Laut
 (I)
 (II)

Radja
Raki
Roepat
Rondo
Rotti

Notes

References

External links
http://www.maritiemmuseum.nl (Maritime Museum Rotterdam)
 

Defunct shipping companies of the Netherlands
Defunct transport companies of the Netherlands
1870 establishments in the Netherlands
Transport companies established in 1870